Eravipuram is a Neighbourhood of the city of Kollam in Kerala, India. It is one among the 6 zones of the Kollam City Corporation. Other zones of the city of Kollam are Central Zone-I, Central Zone-II, Sakthikulangara, Kilikollur and Vadakkevila.

Location
Eravipuram town is only 8 km away from Kollam city. Other nearby towns are Kottiyam, Mayyanad, Paravur etc. Paravur is 19 km away from Eravipuram. Eravipuram railway station is the nearest railway station, which is one among the 3 railway stations serving the city of Kollam.

Geography
This place has a long coastal line with Arabian Sea.
Portion of TS canal passes through it.

State government offices
 Eravipuram, Sub Registrar Office
 Assistant Director of Agriculture, Eravipuram, Valathungal P.O
 Eravipuram, Krishi Bhavan, Valathungal P.O
 Eravipuram Village office, Valathungal P.O

Land Marks at Eravipuram
Schools in Eravipuram

 Bishop Jerome English Medium Public School
 St John's High School, Eravipuram
 Govt. HSS, Valathungal
 Govt. VHSS, Valathungal
 Govt. Primary School, Valathungal
 Believer's Church Mahathma Central School
 CVMLPS school, Thanni
 Mannam Memorial School, Pinaykkal
 Govt: Higher Secondary School, Eravipuram, Thattamala
 Eravipuram Railway Station, Kavalpura.
 Nirmala Hospital, Kavalpura, Eravipuram.
 Aalummoodu Siva Kshethram.
 St. John's Baptist Church, Eravipuram
 Lord Krishna Temple
 Kerala academy of management studies
 Sree Saravana Temple (Vanchiyil Kovil)
 Kalarivathukkal Mahadevar Temple
 Valathungal Kavu
 Kolloorvila Juma Masjid
 ECHS Polyclinic
 Chthettinada Sree Durga/Bhadra Devi Kshethram.
 Chettinada Ambalakkulam, Eravipuram Jn, Eravipuram.
 Puthennada Sree Durga Devi Kshethram.
 Puthennada Varuvil Kavu Kshethram.
 Snehatheeram Tsunami Residence Association, Vadakkumbhagam
 Civil supply., Thirumukku
 AJ Hall (AJ Fernandez and Joyce Albert memorial Community Hall), Eravipuram Junction.
 Good Shepherd Kinder Garten, Kavalpura.RJ
 Kunnathkkavu Mahavishnu Temple.

See also
 Kollam
 Kollam Municipal Corporation
 Sakthikulangara
 Kilikollur
 Vadakkevila

External links

Map of Eravipram
KMJ Masjid

References

 https://www.facebook.com/groups/Eravipuram/

Neighbourhoods in Kollam